Tito Livio Ferreira (June 4, 1894 – December 15, 1988) was a Brazilian historian, teacher and journalist.

Partial bibliography 
(By year of first ed.)
 "Anchieta e as Canárias" (1953)
 "Padre Manoel da Nobrega" (1957)
 “História da Civilização Brasileira” (1959)
 “A Maçonaria na Independência Brasileira” (1961)
 "Histórico das Festas Centenarias da Beneficêcia Portuguesa de S. Paulo" (1964)
 "História da Educação Lusobrasileira" (1966)
 "Nóbrega e Anchieta Em São Paulo de Piratininga"
 "O Elemento Espanhol na Capitania de São Vicente" (1973)
 "O Idioma Oficial do Brasil é o Português?" (1977)
 "A Ordem de Cristo e o Brasil" (Ibrasa, 1980)
 "O Brasil não foi Colónia".

Notes 

1890s births
1988 deaths
20th-century Brazilian historians
Brazilian journalists
Federal University of Rio de Janeiro alumni
Writers from São Paulo
Recipients of the Order of Christ (Portugal)
20th-century Brazilian male writers
20th-century journalists